Doctor Marially González Huertas is a Puerto Rican senator for the district of Ponce, Puerto Rico. She is a member of Puerto Rico's Partido Popular Democratico and President pro tempore of the Puerto Rico Senate.

González Huertas has a Bachelor of Science in Social Sciences with a concentration in psychology at the University of Puerto Rico, Río Piedras Campus and later graduated from the Doctoral Program in School Psychology of the Interamerican University of Puerto Rico.

See also
 List of Puerto Ricans

References

Living people
Interamerican University of Puerto Rico alumni
Members of the Senate of Puerto Rico
Popular Democratic Party (Puerto Rico) politicians
Presidents pro tempore of the Senate of Puerto Rico
Politicians from Ponce
Puerto Rican women in politics
University of Puerto Rico alumni
1981 births